road is a state regional road in Ukraine connecting the capital of Ukraine, Kyiv and town Zvenyhorodka in Cherkasy Oblast. The route starts in Kyiv, goes through Fastiv, Bila Tserkva, Tarashcha and ends in Zvenyhorodka.

See also

 Roads in Ukraine
 Ukraine Highways

References

External links
Regional Roads in Ukraine in Russian

Roads in Kyiv Oblast
Roads in Kyiv
Roads in Cherkasy Oblast